is a Japanese swimmer. She competed in the women's 200 metre individual medley at the 2019 World Aquatics Championships held in Gwangju, South Korea. She also competed in the women's 50 metre freestyle and women's 100 metre freestyle events. In both events she did not advance to compete in the semi-finals. She represented Japan at the 2020 Summer Olympics.

References

External links
 

1997 births
Living people
Japanese female medley swimmers
Place of birth missing (living people)
Japanese female freestyle swimmers
Olympic swimmers of Japan
Swimmers at the 2020 Summer Olympics
Universiade medalists in swimming
20th-century Japanese women
21st-century Japanese women
Universiade bronze medalists for Japan
Medalists at the 2017 Summer Universiade